Atol may refer to:
Atol (drink), a traditional cornstarch-based Central American hot drink
atol (programming), a function in C programming language
ATOL 495, a Finnish amphibious ultralight aircraft

ATOL may refer to:
Air Travel Organisers' Licensing, a UK Civil Aviation Authority scheme to protect air travellers

See also 
 Atoll (disambiguation)